The New Guardians were a DC Comics superhero team featured in the short-lived eponymous series The New Guardians. It was a spin-off from the Millennium event and ran for twelve issues, from 1988 through 1989, before being canceled. It is also the name of the group of characters who appeared in the series. The characters first appeared in Millennium #1, (January 1988), written by Steve Engelhart and drawn by Joe Staton. The series has since gained infamy among comic fans due to the second issue, which features "Snowflame", a supervillain who gained powers from the use of cocaine.

History
The New Guardians, who were also initially known as the Chosen, were a group of people selected by a Guardian of the Universe named Herupa Hando Hu and a Zamaron named Nadia Safir in the DC Comics crossover Millennium. These "Chosen" were then given powers by their selectors.

Members of the Chosen were selected from several nationalities to form a superhero group representative of the entire human race.

Original members
Betty Clawman - Formerly an Australian woman, now a disembodied cosmic force with ill-defined abilities, residing in the aboriginal Dreamtime.
Extraño - Peruvian male, the team's resident magician was also one of the first obviously homosexual characters in comics (due to the publication standards of the time, the character's homosexuality could only be implied), and was one of the first to reveal that he was HIV-positive.
Floronic Man - Formerly American male, who became a plant-human creature with a variety of nature-related powers. The character has since been seen in the pages of the Son of Vulcan mini-series where he returned to acting as a villain.
Gloss - A Chinese woman who channels the mystic Dragon Lines of the Earth, and thus sports an array of Earth-related powers. She later joined the Global Guardians, where she remained a member until she was killed by Prometheus.
Harbinger - Agent of the Monitor in Crisis on Infinite Earths, she possessed the powers of flight, self-replication and undefined energy blasts. Keeper of the histories of the multiverse, Harbinger died in the pages of Superman/Batman. Donna Troy has since taken up her mantle.
Jet - An English girl who could manipulate electromagnetic fields to a variety of effects. She was infected with HIV after being bitten by The Hemogoblin, a vampire with AIDS. After apparently giving her life to fend off an alien invasion, Jet is now alive again and leading the Global Guardians.
Ram - Formerly a Japanese man, now a being of silicon and electronics, Ram was physically durable and also had the ability to communicate with electrical equipment over great distances (such as satellites in orbit). He was reportedly killed during a battle in Roulette's casino.
Thomas Kalmaku - An Inuit friend of Hal Jordan's, Tom originally turned down the Guardian's offer of advancement, but later developed the super power to "bring out the best in people". He subsequently left the team and has shown no further signs of possessing such powers.

Green Lantern: New Guardians

Green Lantern: New Guardians is an American comic book series written by Tony Bedard with art by Tyler Kirkham and Batt and published by DC Comics.

The team is made up of a representative of each of the Corps that tap into a particular portion of the emotional spectrum; its members are Kyle Rayner (Green Lantern Corps), Arkillo (Sinestro Corps), Bleez (Red Lantern Corps), Glomulus (Orange Lantern Corps), Munk (Indigo Tribe), Saint Walker (Blue Lantern Corps) and Fatality (Star Sapphires).

An earlier version of the team, consisting of Hal Jordan, Carol Ferris, Sinestro, Atrocitus, Agent Orange, Saint Walker and Indigo-1, was seen during the Brightest Day story arc in Green Lantern.

References

External links
DC Database: New Guardians
DCU Guide: New Guardians
Unofficial Crossover Index: Millennium
Truly Awful Comics: New Guardians #1
Steve Engelhart.com Guide to Millennium
Cosmic Teams: The New Guardians

Comics by Steve Englehart
DC Comics superhero teams
DC Comics titles